Goldeneye, also sometimes called Golden Eye, and subtitled “the Secret Life of Ian Fleming”, is a British television movie of 1989 about the life of the author Ian Fleming, directed by Don Boyd.

The film is based on The Life of Ian Fleming (1966), a biography by John Pearson, who was Fleming's assistant in the 1950s and has access to his private papers.

The film's screenwriter, Reg Gadney, also has a small part as James Bond, the American ornithologist who lent his name to Fleming's eponymous spy.

Cast
Charles Dance as Ian Fleming
Phyllis Logan as Ann Fleming
Patrick Ryecart as Ivar Bryce
Marsha Fitzalan as Loelia
Ed Devereaux as Sir William Stephenson
Julian Fellowes as Noël Coward
Lynsey Baxter as Wren Lieutenant 
Donald Hewlett as Admiral Godfrey
Richard Griffiths as Second Admiral 
Joseph Long as Lucky Luciano
Donald Douglas as Lord Kemsley
David Quilter as Lord Rothermere
Freda Dowie as Harley Street doctor
Christoph Waltz as German spy
Lisa Daniely as Wren Captain 
Reg Gadney as James Bond
Steve Plytas as Dragoumis
Kim Kindersley as Royal Navy Lieutenant
Deborah Moore as Secretary
Philip O'Brien as CBS Interviewer

Notes

External links

1989 films
Works about Ian Fleming
1980s English-language films